The 1411 Fourth Avenue Building is a historic building in Seattle, Washington, that was listed on the National Register of Historic Places on May 28, 1991 (ID #91000633). The 15-story plus basement Art Deco structure is located at the Northwest corner of Fourth Avenue and Union Street. The main entrance is located at 1411 Fourth Avenue.

The building was built in 1928 for the Stimson Realty Company under the direction of the Metropolitan Building Company for $1.1 million by Teufel & Carlson, contractors. Robert C. Reamer was the architect. The building was fully constructed within seven months in 1928, setting a record for a building of its size.

From 1997 to 2012 the ground floor housed Tully's Coffee flagship store on the corner of Fourth Avenue and Union Street. The store was among those closed following Tully's bankruptcy protection filing.

In 2016, it was sold to the Onni Group for $29.6 million.

References

External links

1928 establishments in Washington (state)
Art Deco architecture in Washington (state)
Buildings and structures in Seattle
Downtown Seattle
National Register of Historic Places in Seattle
Office buildings completed in 1928
Office buildings on the National Register of Historic Places in Washington (state)
Robert Reamer buildings